Grayscale is a type of monochromatic imagery.

Grayscale or Greyscale may also refer to:

 Grayscale (band),  an American pop punk band
Grayscale Investments
 Greyscale (film), a feature film by Ryan Dunlap
Greyscale, a fictional skin disease, usually contagious, that afflicts multiple individual characters and the Stonemen in A Song of Ice and Fire and Game of Thrones
 In the Grayscale, a  Chilean drama film
 Greyscale (album), a 2015 album by Camouflage

See also
 Shades of gray